The 9th National Defence Commission (NDC) of North Korea was appointed by the 9th Central People's Committee in its 1st Session. It was replaced on 6 September 1998 by the 11th NDC.

Members

References

Citations

Bibliography
Books:
 

9th Supreme People's Assembly
National Defence Commission
1990 establishments in North Korea
1998 disestablishments in North Korea